Kevin Humphreys may refer to:

 Kevin Humphreys (politician) (born 1958), Irish politician
 Kevin Humphreys (rugby league) (1930–2010), Australian rugby league player and administrator

See also 
 Kevin Humphries, Australian politician